Luis German Valdés Larralde, MD (March 27, 1923 – August 15, 2012) was a Cuban-American surgeon.

Biography

Early life
Son of German Valdés, MD, a prominent dentist, physician and landowner in Yaguajay his mother was Josefa Larralde, daughter of another prominent Yaguajay citizen Don Marcos Larralde. As a boy, Luis German Valdés discovered the "Cuevas De Valdés" when he was 13 years old.  The photograph at the left of his friends at Cuevas De Valdés was given to him by his friend Wilfredo Celaya a few days before he left his surgical pathology fellowship at Harvard, USA. Athletic, he was known for his swan dive.  Educated in the Jesuit tradition at Belen he graduated in 1939 at the age of 16, began medical school and graduated from University of Havana with the degree of Doctor of Medicine in 1946. He was profoundly influenced by Agrupación Católica Universitaria and personally knew the founders. He attended Harvard University surgical pathology fellowship for one year at Harvard University Medical School, Massachusetts General Hospital and Free Hospital for Women, Boston Massachusetts, 1951-52, sponsored by the US State Department. He was a student of Benjamin Castleman whom he greatly admired. He then returned to Cuba. In 1961, Dr. Valdes left Cuba permanently and became a political refugee in the US because of professional and personal harassment and persecution by the Communist Revolution of Fidel Castro. He immigrated to the United States found work as a Pathologist at Carl Vinson Veterans Affairs hospital and repeated his surgical residency at Vanderbilt University. He continued his surgical career in Houston, Texas attaining Chief of Staff of Memorial-Hermann Southeast hospital, retiring at the age of 73.

Marriage and children
He married Thusnelda Mencio Valdés, PhD and had 4 children in a marriage that lasted over 50 years.
 Ignacio Valdés, MD (06/26/1963 – death) Software engineer, nationally and internationally known expert on Electronic Health Records, Psychiatrist, Astronaut, LLC.
 Luis Antero Valdés, PhD (07/17/1961 – death) Psychologist.
 Maria Valdés Zaayman (March 23, 1960 – June 19, 2015) Pediatric nurse, educator.
 Cecilia Valdés, MD (birthdate – death) Reproductive endocrinologist.

Professional associations
 Cuban Society of Surgery (in Cuba, 1960).  President of the Society in Miami (1990-92)
 Cuban Cancerological Society, 1959
 Cuban Branch of the International Angiological Society.
 Texas Medical Association
 American Medical Association
 Fellow American College of Surgeons (1968 to present)
 Southwestern Surgical Congress, 1970.
 Greater Houston Physicians Association, 1975.
 Houston Surgical Society
 H. William Scott, Jr. society
 Harris County Medical Society
 HCMS Retired Physicians Organization
 National Association of Cuban-American Educators
 Agrupación Católica Universitaria
 Belén Jesuit Alumni Association

Community service
 Volunteer Medical work at the San Lorenzo Charity Clinic in Havana, Cuba.
 Chairman of the St. Augustine Catholic Church Parish Council (1992-1994)
 Chairman of the Health Ministry at St. Augustine Church (2002-2003)
 Organized a Charity Bread Distribution Volunteer program with St. Augustine and other parishes (1999-2002)
 Worked with the CHIPS program sponsored by the Retired Physicians’ Organization
 Volunteer work at Medical Bridges (2002 to 2010). Medical Bridges, Inc. sends donated, usable hospital, medical and dental office equipment to 60 nations in the world.

Death and afterward
Cause of death: multiple from dementia, diabetes, and heart disease. Surrounded by family at Houston Hospice.

Philosophical and political views
He was very fond of stories, telling them, had many, and was very entertaining to talk with. The Society of Jesus and the Agrupación Católica Universitaria had a profound effect on his life. He dedicated his life in service to others and was a practicing Catholic. The Cuban revolution changed him forever. He was politically conservative.

Honours and awards
 1990 Memorial Herman Hospital Recognition of Service Award
 2000 Target Hunger Volunteer Trophy
 2000 Ripley House Volunteer Recognition
 2002 “Cuban Ambassador” Awards from Casa Cuba, a Cuban-American organization that recognizes each year an outstanding Cuban-American for his or her professional and community service as an exemplary representative of the *Cuban-American community.
 2004 Retired Physician of the year awarded by the Harris County Retired Physicians Organization.
 2010 Lifetime Service Award given by the Medical Bridges organization of Houston, Texas.

Bibliography
 Case Report of Leriche Syndrome, Lumen Medico, 1950.
 “Enucleation in Lung Surgery with special reference to Hamartoma of the Lung”, Cirugia de Cuba, 1960.
 “Squamus Cell Carcinoma in Situ of the Cervix, its Diagnosis and Treatment, with special reference to the Schiller Test”, paper presented at the Cuban Obstetrics and Gynecology Congress, 1959.
 “The Surgical Correctioon of the Bicornuate Uterus, Subseptum Variety”, a new technique presented at the Cuban Obstetrics and Gynecology Congress, 1959.
 “Thoracic Ducts Cannulation in the Dog”, Journal of Thoracic and Cardiovascular Surgery, St. Louis, Vol. 55, 4, 555-564, 1968.
 “Correction of the Metabolic Acidosis associatied with use of ACD-Preserved Blood for Cardiopulmonary Bypass”, Journal of Thoracic and Cardiovascular Surgery, St. Louis, Vol. 55, 2, 178-187, 1968.
 “Fibrosis of Extrahepatic Biliary System After Continuous Hepatic Artery Infusion of Floxuridine Through an Implantable pump (Infusaid Pump)” Cancer, 57, 1281-1283, 1986.
 “Intestinal Obstruction due to Persimmons”. Gastroenterology for Practitioners,
 “Gastric Volvulus”. Gastroenterology for Practitioners,
 Memoirs: From Cuba with Love , Unpublished Manuscript.

References

Cuban emigrants to the United States
1923 births
2012 deaths
Cuban physicians
University of Havana alumni
Harvard University alumni
Vanderbilt University alumni
Cuban Roman Catholics